William John Mitchell (born 1 December 1947) is a former New Zealand cricketer, who played first-class cricket for Northern Districts and Otago. A right-handed batsman and occasional right-arm medium pace bowler, Mitchell played 14 first-class matches between 1964 and 1969, scoring 634 runs at 27.56 and taking one wicket.

Career
Born in Auckland, Mitchell began his first-class career in 1964 for Northern Districts. He began successfully, playing three matches over the summer of 1964/65 and scoring 212 runs at 53.00, including one half century and the only century of his career, 127* on debut against Pakistan. He also took his only first class wicket in this debut match, that of Abdul Kadir.

Mitchell had a far less successful season over the summer of 1965/66. where he again played three matches for Northern Districts; however his return was only 71 runs at 14.20, with a high score of 38. The following season, his last for Northern Districts, returned 252 runs from six matches at 22.90, with two fifties and a high score of 74. For the next season, Mitchell moved to Otago. He played two matches in the 1968/69 season, scoring 99 runs at 33.00, the second highest season average of his career, with a single half century of 52 his highest score.

Mitchell also played two matches for the New Zealand Under–23s during his career, returning with a total of 104 runs, the majority of which from a high score of 74, the only half century of his Under–23 career, at an average of 26.00.

References

External links
 

New Zealand cricketers
1947 births
Northern Districts cricketers
Otago cricketers
Living people
Cricketers from Auckland